The 97th Flying Training Squadron is part of the 340th Flying Training Group and is the Reserve associate to the 80th Flying Training Wing based at Sheppard Air Force Base, Texas.

The 97th flew combat in the European Theater of Operations and the Mediterranean Theater of Operations between 25 December 1942 and 3 May 1945.
It flew fighter escort and air defense from, 1947–1949 and air defense from, 1951-1957.

The squadron was redesignated as the 97th Flying Training Squadron and trained USAF pilots to fly supersonic jet aircraft from 1973 to 1993.  Since 1998 it has trained fighter pilots for the United States as well as America's European and NATO allies.

Mission
The squadron operates Beechcraft T-6A Texan II and Northrop T-38 Talon aircraft conducting flight training for the Euro-NATO Joint Jet Pilot Training Program (ENJJPT) with highly experienced Air Force Reserve instructor pilots.

History

World War II

The squadron was first activated in early 1942 at Harding Field, Louisiana as the 97th Pursuit Squadron, one of the original three squadrons of the 82d Pursuit Group.  It soon moved to California where it equipped with Lockheed P-38 Lightnings and began training with Fourth Air Force as the 97th Fighter Squadron.  It left California in the fall and sailed for Northern Ireland, where it received additional combat training under Eighth Air Force.  A month after the initial Operation Torch landings in North Africa the squadron deployed to Algeria, where it entered combat as an element of Twelfth Air Force.

In North Africa, the squadron flew antisubmarine patrols, bomber escort missions and attacked enemy shipping and airfields, moving its base east through Algeria and Tunisia.  As the North African campaign drew to a close, the unit began attacking targets in Italy, earning a Distinguished Unit Citation for its actions on 25 April 1943 during an attack on enemy airfields in Foggia.

In September, the squadron participated in Operation Husky, the invasion of Sicily, during which it was awarded a second Distinguished Unit Citation for a bomber escort mission against marshalling yards near Naples.  The squadron moved to Italy, where it became part of Fifteenth Air Force as part of the buildup to providee fighter cover for Fifteenth's heavy bombers.  On 10 June 1944 the squadron earned a third Distinguished Unit Citation for its actions during an attack on oil refineries in Ploiești, Romania.

Following the surrender of Germany, the squadron remained in Italy until September 1945, when it was inactivated  In the course of the war the squadron was credited with the destruction of 146 enemy aircraft.

Cold War
In 1947 the squadron was again activated at Grenier Field, New Hampshire, where it was equipped with North American P-51 Mustangs as a Strategic Air Command fighter escort unit.   Between April and June 1948 the squadron deployed to Ladd Air Force Base, Alaska, where it practiced rendezvousing with and escorting bombers, intercepting simulated enemy bombers and aerial gunnery.  In August 1949 it was transferred to Continental Air Command and its primary role became air defense, but this mission change was brief, for the squadron was inactivated in October.

In late 1950, the squadron, now designated the 97th Fighter-Interceptor Squadron, was activated under Air Defense Command (ADC) at Wright-Patterson Air Force Base, Ohio and soon began to equip with North American F-86 Sabres.  Although it was assigned to Eastern Air Defense Force, in the first year it was active, it was attached to both the 56th and 142d Fighter-Interceptor Wings.  This was due to ADC's difficulty under the existing wing base organizational structure in deploying fighter squadrons to best advantage.  As a result, in February 1952 ADC reorganized its fighter forces on a regional basis, and the squadron was reassigned to the 4706th Defense Wing.

In August 1955, ADC implemented Project Arrow, which was designed to bring back on the active list the fighter units which had compiled memorable records in the two world wars.  Project Arrow was also designed to reunite fighter squadrons with their traditional headquarters.  As a result, the 97th moved on paper to New Castle County Airport, Delaware, where it assumed the mission, personnel, and Mighty Mouse Rocket armed Lockheed F-94 Starfire aircraft of the 332d Fighter-Interceptor Squadron, which moved on paper to McGuire Air Force Base, New Jersey.  Meanwhile, the 97th's personnel and equipment at Wright-Patterson were assigned to the 56th Fighter-Interceptor Squadron.  The squadron remained at New Castle until it was inactivated in 1958.

Flying Training
In 1972 Air Training Command replaced its Major Command (MAJCOM) controlled flying training units with USAF controlled units (AFCON) units.  As part of this program the squadron was redesignated the 97th Flying Training Squadron and activated at Williams Air Force Base, Arizona when its parent 82d Flying Training Wing replaced the 3525th Pilot Training Wing.  At Williams the unit trained USAF pilots to fly Northrop T-38 Talon supersonic jet aircraft in the advanced phase of the Undergraduate Pilot Training program. The squadron was inactivated in 1993 when Williams closed in the second round of the Base Realignment and Closure program.

In 1998, the 97th Flying Training Squadron was activated in the Air Force Reserve at Sheppard Air Force Base, Texas as an associate of the 80th Flying Training Wing.  The 80th wing conducts the European-North Atlantic Treaty Organization Joint Jet Pilot Training Program.  The squadron also uses the T-38C in the Introduction to Fighter Fundamentals course (IFF), an advanced pilot course that teaches basic fighter maneuvers.  As the reserve associate unit for these programs the squadron uses Air Force Reserve instructor pilots to perform student training.

Lineage
 Constituted as the 97th Pursuit Squadron (Interceptor) on 13 January 1942
 Activated on 9 February 1942
 Redesignated 97th Pursuit Squadron (Interceptor) (Twin Engine) on 22 April 1942
 Redesignated 97th Fighter Squadron (Twin Engine) on 15 May 1942
 Redesignated 97th Fighter Squadron, Two Engine on 28 February 1944
 Inactivated on 9 September 1945
 Activated on 12 April 1947 *
 Redesignated 97th Fighter Squadron, Single Engine on 15 August 1947
 Inactivated on 2 October 1949
 Redesignated 97th Fighter-Interceptor Squadron on 13 November 1950
 Activated on 1 December 1950
 Inactivated on 8 January 1958
 Redesignated 97th Flying Training Squadron on 22 June 1972
 Activated on 1 February 1973
 Inactivated on 1 April 1993
 Activated on 1 April 1998

Assignments
 82d Pursuit Group (later 82d Fighter Group), 9 February 1942 - 9 September 1945
 82d Fighter Group, 12 April 1947 -2 October 1949
 Eastern Air Defense Force, 1 December 1950 (attached to 56th Fighter-Interceptor Wing until 20 May 1951, then to 142d Fighter-Interceptor Wing)
 4706th Defense Wing (later 4706th Air Defense Wing), 6 February 1952
 82d Fighter Group, 18 August 1955 – 8 January 1958
 82d Flying Training Wing, 1 February 1973 –
 82d Operations Group, 15 December 1991 - 1 April 1993
 340th Flying Training Group, 1 April 1998 – Present

Stations

 Harding Field, Louisiana, 9 February 1942
Muroc Army Air Field, California, 17 April 1942
Long Beach Army Air Field, California, 22 May 1942 - 16 September 1942
RAF Eglinton, Northern Ireland, 5 October 1942
Tafaraoui Airfield, Algeria, 24 December 1942
 Telergma Airfield, Algeria, 1 January 1943
 Berteaux Airfield, Algeria, 28 March 1943
 Souk-el-Arba Airfield, Tunisia, 13 June 1943
 Grombalia Airfield, Tunisia, 4 August 1943
 Operated from Gerbini Airfield, Sicily, 6 September 1943 – 18 September 1943)

 San Pancrazio Airfield, Italy, 3 October 1943
 Lecce Airfield, Italy, 10 October 1943
 Vincenzo Airfield, Italy 11 January 1944
 Lesina Airfield, Italy, c. 30 August 1945 - 9 September 1945
 Grenier Field (later Grenier Air Force Base), New Hampshire, 12 April 1947 -2 October 1949
 (deployed to Ladd Air Force Base, Alaska, 4 April 1948 - 29 June 1948)
 Wright-Patterson Air Force Base, Ohio, 1 December 1950
 New Castle Airport, Delaware, 18 August 1955 – 8 January 1958
 Williams Air Force Base, Arizona, 1 February 1973 – 1 April 1993
 Sheppard Air Force Base, Texas, 1 April 1998 – Present

Aircraft

 Lockheed P-38 Lightning (1942–1945)
F-51 Mustang (1947–1949)
 F-86D Sabre Interceptor (1951–1955)
 F-94C Starfire (1955–1957)

 Northrop T-38A Talon (1973-1993, 1998–2005)
 Northrop T-38C Talon (2005–Present)
T-37 Tweet (1998-2009)
 Northrop AT-38B Talon (1998–2006)
 Beechcraft T-6 Texan II (2008–Present)

Awards and Campaigns

See also

References

Notes
Explanatory Notes

Citations

Bibliography

 Buss, Lydus H.(ed), Sturm, Thomas A., Volan, Denys, and McMullen, Richard F., History of Continental Air Defense Command and Air Defense Command July to December 1955, Directorate of Historical Services, Air Defense Command, Ent AFB, CO, 1956
 
 
 
 
 
 
 

Further reading

External links
80th Flying Training Wing Heritage Pamphlet
Euro-NATO Joint Jet Pilot Training (ENJJPT) Program Fact Sheet

Military units and formations in Texas
0097
Military units and formations established in 1942